Posht Darb-e Vosta (also romanized as Posht Darb-e Vostá; also known as Dareynak and Darnīk) is a village in Aghili-ye Shomali Rural District, Aghili District, Gotvand County, Khuzestan Province, Iran. At the 2006 census, its population was 196, in 30 families.

References 

Populated places in Gotvand County